Uwe Wolf (born 10 August 1967 in Neustadt an der Weinstraße) is a German football coach and former professional player.

Honours
Necaxa
 Primera División de México: 1995–96

References

External links

1967 births
Living people
German footballers
Association football defenders
1. FC Nürnberg players
TSV 1860 Munich players
Club Necaxa footballers
Club Puebla players
Dynamo Dresden players
FC Red Bull Salzburg players
S.C. Freamunde players
TSV 1860 Munich managers
German football managers
Bundesliga players
KSV Hessen Kassel managers
2. Bundesliga managers
People from Neustadt an der Weinstraße
Südliche Weinstraße
Liga MX players
3. Liga managers
Footballers from Rhineland-Palatinate
German expatriate footballers
German expatriate sportspeople in Mexico
Expatriate footballers in Mexico